Robert Raynolds McMath (May 11, 1891 – January 2,  1962) was a U.S. solar astronomer.

Robert R. McMath (1891-1962) was a bridge engineer, businessman, and astronomer. Robert's father, Francis C. McMath, had made a fortune as a bridge builder. They both had a keen interest in amateur astronomy. So in 1922, the McMaths, along with Judge Henry S. Hulbert founded the McMath–Hulbert Observatory in Lake Angelus, Michigan. It was deeded to the University of Michigan in 1931, Robert served as the director of the McMath–Hulbert Observatory until 1961.

In 1932, Robert extended the functionality of the spectroheliograph so that it could record motion pictures of the sun. This machine is known as a spectroheliokinematograph; with it, he took astonishing moving pictures of solar storms, showing features on the sun's surface that lasted from seconds to days.

In 1933, he and his father received the Franklin Institute's John Price Wetherill Medal.

Robert McMath was an adviser to the National Science Foundation in its early years and he chaired the panel that advised NSF on the need for a national observatory. A site on Kitt Peak, Arizona was finally chosen for the Kitt Peak National Observatory (KPNO). Robert McMath along with the eminent astronomer Keith Pierce built a new, larger solar telescope on Kitt Peak called the McMath–Pierce solar telescope. Robert McMath served as the first president of Association of Universities for Research in Astronomy (AURA) from 1957 to 1958, and thereafter as chairman of the AURA board.

See also
McMath–Hulbert Observatory
McMath–Pierce solar telescope
Peach Mountain Observatory
McMath (crater)
1955 McMath

References

External links
Timeline of McMath-Hulbert Observatory
National Academy of Sciences Biographical Memoir

1891 births
1962 deaths
20th-century American astronomers